Einhart Lorenz (born 17 February 1940) is a German-Norwegian historian, and professor emeritus at the University of Oslo. NKP 1923-1931 (1983), Veien mot Holocaust (2003), Jødisk historie, kultur og identiteter (2010) and Willy Brandt. Et politisk liv (2013). He was the first Henrik Steffens Professor at the Humboldt University of Berlin from 1998 to 2001.

Personal life
Lorenz was born in Hirschberg (today Jelenia Góra) on 17 February 1940.

References

1940 births
Living people
20th-century Norwegian historians
Academic staff of the University of Oslo
Academic staff of the Humboldt University of Berlin
21st-century Norwegian historians